George Frisbie Hoar (August 29, 1826 – September 30, 1904) was an American attorney and politician who represented Massachusetts in the United States Senate from 1877 to 1904. He belonged to an extended family that became politically prominent in 18th- and 19th-century New England.

An abolitionist and Radical Republican, Hoar recognized the immorality of slavery and was raised in a household which actively opposed racial bigotry and often defied laws they deemed unjust. Hoar strongly opposed and assailed the Democratic Party, which he viewed as the party of the saloon keeper, ballot box stuffer, and Ku Klux Klan.

Hoar was referred to by his middle name "Frisbie" among friends.

Early life
Hoar was born in Concord, Massachusetts, on August 29, 1826. He studied for several months at a boarding school in Waltham, Massachusetts, run by Samuel and Sarah Bradford Ripley. He graduated from Harvard University in 1846 and earned his law degree at Harvard Law School in 1849. He was admitted to the bar and settled in Worcester, Massachusetts, where he practiced law. Initially a member of the Free Soil Party, he joined the Republican Party shortly after its founding.

Political career
Hoar was elected to the Massachusetts House of Representatives in 1852 and to the Massachusetts Senate in 1857.

He represented Massachusetts as a member of the U.S. House of Representatives for four terms from 1869 to 1877 and then served in the U.S. Senate until his death during his fifth term. For one term during his House service, from 1873 to 1875, his brother Ebenezer Rockood Hoar served alongside him. He was a Republican and generally avoided heavy partisanship and did not hesitate to criticize other members of the party whose actions or policies he believed were in error. In 1880 he was chairman of the 1880 Republican National Convention. When James Garfield, who eventually won the party's nomination and the presidential election, rose to object that votes were being cast for him without his consent, Hoar disallowed his objection. He later said: "I was terribly afraid that he would say something that would make his nomination impossible."

An economic nationalist, Hoar believed in capitalism as progress for civilization in accordance to the plans by God. He supported measures which aimed at protecting American industries from foreign competition.

In Congress, Hoar established a reputation as a conservative on economic issues. He opposed monetary inflation, post-war greenbacks without the backing of gold, and free coinage of silver. In addition to viewing silver as an "inferior metal," Hoar favored protectionist tariffs, a common position within the Republican Party.

In 1874, a dying Charles Sumner lay on his deathbed, and among his last visitors were Rep. Hoar. Sumner told the representative to ensure passage of what became known as the Civil Rights Act of 1875:

Indeed, Hoar successfully fought in ensuring the bill's passage, although it became law in a weakened form.

Hoar was long noted as a fighter against political corruption. He campaigned for the rights of African Americans and Native Americans, which included the reusing of tribal lands for individual settlement of Native Americans. He was a strong advocate of the Dawes Act and allotment schemes which allocated communal tribal lands to individuals. He explained these views by comparing federal Indian relations to that of "a father to his son, or by a guardian to an insane ward..." - out of context. He opposed the Chinese Exclusion Act of 1882, describing it as "nothing less than the legalization of racial discrimination" He was a member of the Congressional Electoral Commission that settled the highly disputed 1876 U.S. presidential election. He authored the Presidential Succession Act of 1886.

During the 1884 United States presidential election, Hoar expressed sharp anger at Mugwumps, Republicans who supported Bourbon Democrat Grover Cleveland over GOP nominee James G. Blaine; he asserted to a friend who supported Cleveland:

Hoar argued in the Senate in favor of women's suffrage as early as 1886. Hoar was one of only seven senators, and one of only two Republican senators (along with Henry W. Blair of New Hampshire), to vote against the Edmunds–Tucker Act of 1887, which abolished women's suffrage in Utah after it had been a territorial right since 1870 (among other stipulations which were mainly aimed at eliminating Mormon polygamy and curbing the institutional power of the Church of Jesus Christ of Latter-day Saints there).

He was a consistent opponent of American imperialism. He did not share his Senate colleagues' enthusiasm for American intervention in Cuba in the late 1890s. In December 1897, he met with Native Hawaiian leaders opposed to the annexation of their nation. He then presented the Kūʻē Petitions to Congress and helped to defeat President William McKinley's attempt to annex the Republic of Hawaii by treaty, though the islands were eventually annexed by means of joint resolution, called the Newlands Resolution.

After the Spanish–American War, Hoar became one of the Senate's most outspoken opponents of the imperialism of the McKinley administration. He denounced the Philippine–American War and called for independence for the Philippines in a three-hour speech in the Senate, saying:

Hoar pushed for and served on the Lodge Committee, investigating allegations, later confirmed, of United States war crimes in the Philippine–American War. He also denounced the U.S. intervention in Panama.

Hoar voted against the Chinese Exclusion Act.

Other interests
In 1865, Hoar was one of the founders of the Worcester County Free Institute of Industrial Science, now the Worcester Polytechnic Institute.

Hoar was active in the American Historical Association and the American Antiquarian Society, serving terms as president of both organizations. He was elected a member of the American Antiquarian Society in 1853, and served as vice-president from 1878 to 1884, and then served as president from 1884 to 1887. In 1887 he was among the founders of the American Irish Historical Society.  He was a regent of the Smithsonian Institution in 1880 and a trustee of the Peabody Museum of Archaeology and Ethnology. Through his efforts, the lost manuscript of William Bradford's Of Plymouth Plantation (1620–1647), an important founding document of the United States, was returned to Massachusetts, after being discovered in Fulham Palace, London, in 1855.

Hoar was elected a Fellow of the American Academy of Arts and Sciences in 1901. His autobiography, Autobiography of Seventy Years, was published in 1903. It appeared first in serial form in Scribner's magazine.

He attended the Unitarian Church of All Souls in Washington, D.C.

Hoar enjoyed good health until June 1904. He died in Worcester on September 30 of that year and was buried in Sleepy Hollow Cemetery, Concord. After his death, a statue of him was erected in front of Worcester's city hall, paid for by public donations.

Family
In 1853, Hoar married Mary Louisa Spurr (1831–1859).  In 1862, he married Ruth Ann Miller (1830–1903).  With his first wife, he was the father of a son, U.S. Representative Rockwood Hoar, and a daughter, Mary (1854–1929).  With his second wife he was the father of a daughter, Alice (1863–1864).

Through his mother, Sarah Sherman, G.F. Hoar was a grandson of prominent political figure, Roger Sherman and Sherman's second wife, Rebecca Minot Prescott. Roger Sherman signed the Articles of Confederation,  United States Declaration of Independence and the United States Constitution.
 G. F. Hoar's father, Samuel Hoar, was a prominent lawyer who served on the Massachusetts state senate and the United States House of Representatives.
G. F. Hoar's brother Ebenezer Rockwood Hoar was an Associate Justice of the Massachusetts Supreme Judicial Court, one of Ulysses S. Grant's Attorneys General, and a nominee to the U.S. Supreme Court.
 G. F. Hoar's first cousin Roger Sherman Baldwin was Governor of Connecticut and a U.S. Senator; and William Maxwell Evarts was US Secretary of State, U.S. Attorney General and a U.S. Senator.
 He was the uncle of U.S. Representative Sherman Hoar, and the great uncle of Massachusetts State Senator and Assistant Attorney General Roger Sherman Hoar.
 His second wife's sister, Alice Miller (1840—1900), married U.S. Representative William W. Rice, G. F. Hoar's successor as U.S. Representative from Massachusetts.

See also
List of United States Congress members who died in office (1900–1949)

Notes

References

Further reading
 .
 
 Hoar, George F. Autobiography of Seventy Years. 2 vols., New York: Scribner's Sons, 1903.
 Welch, Richard E., Jr. George Frisbie Hoar and the Half-Breed Republicans. Cambridge: Harvard University Press, 1971. online a scholarly biography

External links
 
 George Frisbie Hoar Papers
 Sherman-Hoar family  at Political Graveyard
 Baldwin-Greene-Gager family of Connecticut  at Political Graveyard
 George Frisbie Hoar, late a representative from Massachusetts, Memorial addresses delivered in the House of Representatives and Senate frontispiece 1905

 
 

1826 births
1904 deaths
Activists for African-American civil rights
Christian abolitionists
Members of the Massachusetts House of Representatives
Massachusetts state senators
Politicians from Worcester, Massachusetts
People of the Spanish–American War
People of the Philippine–American War
Presidents of the American Historical Association
Massachusetts lawyers
Fellows of the American Academy of Arts and Sciences
Harvard Law School alumni
Republican Party United States senators from Massachusetts
Massachusetts Free Soilers
Radical Republicans
Republican Party members of the United States House of Representatives from Massachusetts
Members of the American Antiquarian Society
19th-century American politicians
Sherman family (U.S.)
American anti-corruption activists
American suffragists
Civil service reform in the United States
Half-Breeds (Republican Party)